Two-time defending champion Shingo Kunieda won the men's singles wheelchair tennis title at the 2010 US Open after Nicolas Peifer withdrew before the final. It was his third US Open singles title and eleventh major singles title overall.

Seeds
 Shingo Kunieda (champion)
 Maikel Scheffers (semifinals)

Draw

Finals

External links 
 Main Draw

Wheelchair Men's Singles

pl:US Open 2010#Gra pojedyncza mężczyzn na wózkach